This list of game awards is an index to articles about notable awards given for games. Separate lists cover video game awards, board game awards,  Game of the Year awards for video games and Game of the Year awards for board games

List

See also

 Lists of awards
 Board game awards
 List of Game of the Year awards (board games)
 List of Game of the Year awards
 List of video game awards

References

 
Game